David Garcia del Valle (born 13 June 1981) is a judo athlete from Spain, who has represented Spain at the 2000 Summer Paralympics, 2004 Summer Paralympics, 2008 Summer Paralympics and 2012 Summer Paralympics, winning a pair of silver medals in 2000 and 2004.

Personal 
García was born 13 June 1981 in Almeria. He has a vision impairment.  He resides in Granada.

Judo 
García is a B2 classified judo competitor.
He took home a gold medal in his weight class at the 2011 IPC European Judo Championships. In October 2011, he competed in a regional Spanish national vision impaired judo event in Guadalajara. In 2012, he won the Spanish national disability judo championship. He competed in the 2013 Spanish national disability judo championship organized by the  Spanish Federation of Sports for the Blind. In April 2013, he was one of the organizers of the II Festival Soliadrio Jushirokan in Madrid.  The event was a master class in judo. The 2013 IPC European Judo Championships were held in early December in  Eger, Hungary, and he competed in them in the (under 66 kilos event.  He lost his first match of the competition.  Going into the competition, he was viewed as one of the favorites to potentially win a medal for Spain.

Paralympics 
García competed in judo at the  2000 Summer Paralympics, 2004 Summer Paralympics, 2008 Summer Paralympics and 2012 Summer Paralympics. He earned a silver in the Up to 66 kg men's group at the 2000 and 2004 Games.  In November 2013, he competed in the Open Judo Tournament Guadalajara.

References

External links 
 
 
 

Living people
Paralympic judoka of Spain
Visually impaired category Paralympic competitors
Judoka at the 2012 Summer Paralympics
Judoka at the 2008 Summer Paralympics
Judoka at the 2004 Summer Paralympics
Judoka at the 2000 Summer Paralympics
1981 births
Medalists at the 2000 Summer Paralympics
Medalists at the 2004 Summer Paralympics
Spanish male judoka
Paralympic medalists in judo
Paralympic silver medalists for Spain
Spanish blind people